Gurshad Kandi (also Romanized as Gūrshād Kandī; also known as Āq Qabāq-e Golshād Kandī and Gūrshādī Kandī) is a village in Aslan Duz Rural District, Aslan Duz District, Parsabad County, Ardabil Province, Iran. At the 2006 census, its population was 73, in 14 families.

References 

Towns and villages in Parsabad County